HMS LST-401 was a United States Navy  that was transferred to the Royal Navy during World War II. As with many of her class, the ship was never named. Instead, she was referred to by her hull designation.

Construction
LST-401 was laid down on 17 August 1942, under Maritime Commission (MARCOM) contract, MC hull 921, by the Bethlehem-Fairfield Shipyard, Baltimore, Maryland; launched 16 October 1942; then transferred to the United Kingdom and commissioned on 30 November 1942.

Service history 
LST-401 saw no active service in the United States Navy. She served in the Royal Navy through the end of World War II and was returned to the custody of the United States Navy on 7 March 1946. On 5 June 1946, less than three months after her return, she was struck from the Navy list; and, on 11 October 1947, she was sold to Luria Brothers & Co., of Philadelphia, Pennsylvania.

See also 
 List of United States Navy LSTs

Notes 

Citations

Bibliography 

Online resources

External links

 

Ships built in Baltimore
1942 ships
LST-1-class tank landing ships of the Royal Navy
World War II amphibious warfare vessels of the United Kingdom
S3-M2-K2 ships